Cuba competed at the 2011 Pan American Games in Guadalajara, Mexico from October 14 to 30, 2011. Jorge Marrero Gonzalez was the Chef de mission.

Medalists

Archery

Cuba has qualified three male and three female athletes in the archery competition.

Men

Women

Athletics

Men

Track and road events

*-Indicates athletes that participated in the preliminaries but not the finals

Field events

Combined events

Women

Field events

Combined events

Badminton

Cuba has qualified two male and two female athletes in the individual and team badminton competitions.

Men

Women

Mixed

Baseball

Cuba has qualified a baseball team of twenty athletes to participate.

Team

Jose Dariel Abreu
Yosvany Alarcón
Freddy Álvarez
Erisbel Arruebarruena
Alexei Bell
Rusney Castillo
Frederich Cepeda
Alfredo Despaigne
Giorbis Duvergel
Michel Enrique
Miguel González
Norberto González
Yulieski González
Yulieski Gourriel
Dalier Hinojosa
Miguel Lahera
Jonder Martínez
Frank Morejon
Vicyohandrys Odelin
Héctor Olivera
Yadier Pedroso
Ariel Pestano
Rudy Reyes
Alberto Soto

Standings

Results

Preliminary round

Semifinal

Third Place

Basque pelota

Cuba has qualified two athletes each in the paleta leather pairs trinkete, paleta leather pairs 36m fronton, paleta leather pairs 30m fronton, frontenis pairs 30m fronton, women's paleta rubber pairs trinkete, and women's frontenis pairs 30m fronton competitions. Cuba has also qualified one athlete each in the mano singles trinkete and mano singles 36m fronton competitions.

Men

Women

Beach volleyball

Cuba has qualified a men's and women's team in the beach volleyball competition.

Men

Women

Boxing

Cuba  qualified nine athletes in the 49 kg, 52 kg, 56 kg, 60 kg, 64 kg, 69 kg, 75 kg, 81 kg, and 91 kg men's categories.

Men

Canoeing

Cuba has qualified twelve boats in the K-1 200, K-2 200, K-1 1000, K-2 1000, K-4 1000, C-1 200, C-1 1000, C-2 1000, women's K-1 200, women's K-1 500, women's K-2 500 and women's K-4 500 categories.

Men

Women

Cycling

Road Cycling

Men

Women

Track cycling

Sprints & Pursuit

Keirin

Omnium

Mountain Biking

Men

Diving

Men

Women

Fencing

Cuba has qualified athletes in the men's and women's individual and team épée, foil, and sabre competitions.

Men

Women

Field hockey

Cuba has qualified a men's and women's team in the field hockey competition.

Men

Team

Alexander Abreu
Roger Aguilera
Jeancel Barzaga
Yoandy Blanco
Jasel Cabrera
Yendry Delgado
Lazaro Garcia
Yendrys Herrera
Roberto Lemus
Yuri Perez
Vladimir Prado
Yankel Rojas
Heriberto Sarduy
Darian Valero
Yoel Veitia
Ederbeni Zayas

Standings

Results

Semifinals

Bronze medal match

Women

Team

Yailyn Abrahan
Kenia Alvarez
Mileysi Argentel
Osdelaisy Carmenate
Helec Carta
Yeney Casas
Yordalia Duquernes
Maribel Garcia
Roseli Harrys
Yaniuska Pasa
Annelis Reyna
Teydi Rodriguez
Marisbel Sierra
Damnay Solis
Anisley Texido
Yuraima Vera

Standings

Results

Crossover

Fifth place match

Football

Cuba has qualified a men's team in the football competition.

Men

Squad

Dalain Aira
Dayron Blanco
Carlos Castellanos
Maikel Chang
Odisnel Cooper
Heviel Cardoves
Jorge Corrales
Adrián Diz
Ernesto Duanes
Carlos Francisco
Dayan Hernandez
José Macías
Renay Malblanche
Ricardo Pena
Andy Ramos
Yasnay Rivero
Francisco Salazar
Over Urgelles

Standings

Results

Gymnastics

Artistic
Cuba has qualified two male athletes and six female athletes in the artistic gymnastics competition.

Men

Individual qualification & Team Finals

Individual Finals

Women
Individual qualification & Team Finals

Individual Finals

Rhythmic
Cuba has qualified two individual athletes and one team in the rhythmic gymnastics competition.

Individual

All Around

Group

All Around

Trampoline
Cuba has qualified one female athlete in the trampoline gymnastics competition.

Women

Judo

Cuba has qualified athletes in all fourteen men's and women's weight categories.

Men

Repechage Rounds

Women

Repechage Rounds

Karate

Cuba has qualified two athletes in the 67 kg and 75 kg men's categories and two athlete in the 55 kg and 68 kg women's category.

Modern pentathlon

Cuba has qualified two male and two female pentathletes.

Men

Women

Roller skating

Cuba has qualified a men's team in the roller skating competition.

Men

Artistic

Women
Artistic

Rowing

Men

Women

Sailing

Cuba has qualified three boats and four athletes in the sailing competition.

Men

Women

Open

Shooting

Men

Women

Softball

Cuba has qualified a team to participate. The team will be made up of 17 athletes.

Team

Yuselys Acosta
Yanitza Avilés
Marlen Bubaire
Yamisleidys Casanova
Lidibet Castellon
Katia Coello
Aleanna De Armas
Leanneyi Gomez
Anisley Lopez
Ludisleydis Nápoles
Yusmelis Ocana
Yusmeri Pacheco
Diamela Puentes
Yarisleidy Rosario
Maylin Sanchez
Yaleisa Soto
Maritza Toledo

Standings

Results

Semifinals

Final

Swimming

Men

Women

Table tennis

Cuba has qualified three male and three female athletes in the individual and men's table tennis competition.

Men

Women

Taekwondo

Cuba has qualified four athletes in the 58 kg, 68 kg, 80 kg, and 80+kg men's categories and four athletes in the 49 kg, 57 kg, 67 kg, and 67+kg women's categories.

Men

Women

Tennis

Men

Women

Mixed doubles

Triathlon

Men

Women

Volleyball

Men

Team

Dariel Albo
Yenry Bell
Rolando Cepeda
Yoandry Diaz
Yulian Duran
Yosniel Guillen
Keibel Gutiérrez
Fernando Hernandez
Raydel Hierrezuelo
Wilfredo Leon
Isbel Mesa
Yassel Perdomo

Standings

Results

Semifinals

Gold medal match

Women

Team

Emily Borrell
Kenia Carcaces
Leanny Castaneda
Ana Cleger
Rosanna Giel
Daymara Lescay
Yoana Palacios
Alena Rojas
Wilma Salas
Yanelys Santos
Yusidey Silié
Gyselle Silva

Standings

Results

Quarterfinals

Semifinals

Gold medal match

Water polo

Men

Team

Yohandri Andrade
Giraldo Carales
Raydel Carales
Ernesto Cisneros
Rudy Despaigne
Rasiel Gallo
Iosse Gonzalez

Yarbul Gonzalez
Rigel Jimenez
Edgar Lara
Gianny Lara
Emilio Oms
Jhonasy Rivas

Standings

Results

Semifinals

Bronze medal match

Women

Team

Mayelin Bernal
Yeliana Bravo
Danay Gutierrez
Leynais Gutierrez
Hirovis Hernandez
Yanet Lopez
Daryana Morales

Yadira Oms
Yordanka Pujol
Arisney Ramos
Lisbeth Santana
Neldys Truffin
Mairelys Zunzunegui

Standings

Results

Semifinals

Bronze medal match

Weightlifting

Wrestling

Cuba has qualified six athletes in the 55 kg, 60 kg, 66 kg, 74 kg, 96 kg, and 120 kg men's freestyle categories, seven athletes in the 55 kg, 60 kg, 66 kg, 74 kg, 84 kg, 96 kg, and 120 kg men's Greco-Roman categories, and two athletes in the 63 kg and 72 kg women's freestyle categories.

Men
Freestyle

Greco-Roman

Women
Freestyle

References

Nations at the 2011 Pan American Games
P
2011